Una viuda difícil is a 1957 Argentine comedy film directed by Fernando Ayala and written by Conrado Nalé Roxlo, based on his homonymous theatre play. It stars Alba Arnova, Alfredo Alcón and Ricardo Castro Ríos. Music was composed by Ástor Piazzolla and Vassili Lambrinos created the choreography for the black and white film.

Synopsis 
In the Colonial Buenos Aires a beautiful widow marries an outcast man just to spite someone else.

Cast 
 Alba Arnova
 Alfredo Alcón
 Ricardo Castro Ríos
 Joaquín Pibernat
 Francisco López Silva
 Mariela Reyes
 María Esther Podestá
 Manuel Alcón
 Lucía Barause
 Marcela Sola
 Carlos Barbetti
 Jorge Hilton
 Luis Orbegoso
 Luis de Lucía
 Francisco Audenino
 Rafael Diserio
 Adolfo Gallo
 Manuel Ochoa
 Sergio Villamil
 Mario Savino
 Alberto Quiles
 Irma Villamil
 Néstor Pérez Fernández
 Amalia Lozano
 Angélica Marina
 Julián Pérez Ávila
 Domingo Garibotto

External links
 

1957 films
1950s Spanish-language films
Argentine black-and-white films
Argentine drama films
Films directed by Fernando Ayala
1950s Argentine films